Vintsent Dunin-Marcinkievič (February 8, 1808 – December 21, 1884) was a Polish-Belarusian writer, poet, dramatist and social activist and is considered one of the founders of the modern Belarusian literary tradition and national school theatre.

Biography
Vintsent Dunin-Marcinkievič was born in a Belarusian part of the Polish–Lithuanian Commonwealth, in a noble family (szlachta of Łabędź coat of arms) in the region of Babruysk. He graduated from the medical faculty of the University of St. Petersburg.

He wrote both in contemporary Belarusian and Polish languages. Writing in the modern Belarusian language he faced the problem of its being not standardized, as the written tradition of the Old Belarusian (Ruthenian) language had been largely extinct by that time.

From 1827 Dunin-Marcinkievič lived and worked in Minsk as a bureaucrat. In 1840 he acquired a mansion near Ivyanets and went there to write most of his works.

In 1859 he translated Adam Mickiewicz's epic poem Pan Tadeusz into the Belarusian language  and published it in Vilnius. Under the pressure of Russian Empire authorities he succeeded in publishing only the first two chapters of the poem. This was the first translation of the poem into another Slavic language.

Dunin-Marcinkievič was accused by the police in separatist propaganda during the January Uprising. He was arrested but later set free. However, he was kept under supervision by the police. His daughter, Kamila Marcinkievič, participated in the uprising and was sentenced to the psychiatric hospital for her political activity.

The writer was buried in Tupalshchyna, now Valozhyn rajon.

Most notable works
 Opera "Sielanka" ("Idyll"; 1846) — the first play, written partly in contemporary Belarusian language.
 Poem "Hapon" (1855) — the first poem, written completely in contemporary Belarusian.
 Plays and poetry, some of them in contemporary Belarusian (1855–1861), some of them being:
 "Wieczernice i Opętany" (1856);
 "Interested? Read it! Three tales and brief verse" (1857);
 "Belarusian piper";
 "Bylicy, raskazy Nawuma" (not published);
 "Chalimon na karanacji" (not published);
 "Lucynka czyli Szwedzi na Litwie" (1861).
 Play "Pinskaja šliachta" ("Pinsk nobility", ; 1866).
 The first Belarusian translation of A. Mickiewicz's "Pan Tadeusz" (1859; published only partly, the circulation confiscated almost immediately).

Note: proper names and place names are rendered in BGN/PCGN.

References

External links

 Virtual guide to Belarus

1808 births
1884 deaths
People from Babruysk District
People from Bobruysky Uyezd
Vintsent
Belarusian writers
Belarusian male poets
Belarusian translators
19th-century Belarusian people
19th-century translators
19th-century Belarusian poets
19th-century Polish male writers
19th-century Polish poets
Polish writers in Belarusian
Belarusian writers in Polish
Belarusian nobility